The Women's 25 km competition of the 2018 European Aquatics Championships was held on 12 August 2018.

Results
The race was started at 09:10.

References

Women's 25 km